The enzyme Phosphoribosylaminoimidazole carboxylase, or AIR carboxylase is involved in nucleotide biosynthesis and in particular in purine biosynthesis. It catalyzes the conversion of 5'-phosphoribosyl-5-aminoimidazole ("AIR") into 5'-phosphoribosyl-4-carboxy-5-aminoimidazole ("CAIR") as described in the reaction:

5-aminoimidazole ribonucleotide + CO2  5'-phosphoribosyl-4-carboxy-5-aminoimidazole + 2 H+

In plants and fungi
Phosphoribosylaminoimidazole carboxylase is a fusion protein in plants and fungi, but consists of two non-interacting proteins in bacteria, PurK and PurE.

The crystal structure of PurE indicates a unique quaternary structure that confirms the octameric nature of the enzyme.

In Escherichia coli
In the bacterium Escherichia coli the reaction is catalyzed in two steps carried out by two separate enzymes, PurK and PurE.

PurK, N5-carboxyaminoimidazole ribonucleotide synthetase, catalyzes the conversion of 5-aminoimidazole ribonucleotide ("AIR"), ATP, and bicarbonate to N5-carboxyaminoimidazole ribonucleotide ("N5-CAIR"), ADP, and phosphate.

PurE, N5-carboxyaminoimidazole ribonucleotide mutase, converts N5-CAIR to CAIR, the sixth step of de novo purine biosynthesis. In the presence of high concentrations of bicarbonate, PurE is reported able to convert AIR to CAIR directly and without ATP. Some members of this family contain two copies of this domain.

References

External links
 
PAICS photo

EC 4.1.1